The South Alabama Soccer Complex is a soccer complex located on the campus of the University of South Alabama campus in Mobile, Alabama.  The facility is the home field of the University of South Alabama Jaguars women's soccer team. The Cage hosted the Sun Belt Conference women's soccer tournament in 2000, 2002, 2005, 2007 and 2012. The complex has a capacity of 1,000 people.

Expansion
In February 2009, the University of South Alabama Jaguars women's soccer team moved into its newly constructed complex, which features a head coach's office, two assistant coaches' offices, locker room, training room, equipment room, conference room, and a player lounge

References

External links
 University of South Alabama Jaguars Athletics official website

Soccer venues in Alabama
South Alabama Jaguars sports venues
College soccer venues in the United States
1991 establishments in Alabama
Sports venues completed in 1991